Diego Fischer Requena (born 1961) is a Uruguayan journalist and writer.

Selected works
 1997, Al este de la historia,  (tres tomos)
 2004, Que nos abrace el viento, 
 2008, Al encuentro de las tres Marías,   
 2010, Qué tupé, 
 2011, Hasta donde me lleve la vida,  
 2012, A mí me aplauden, 
 2013, Serás mía o de nadie, 
 2014, Tres hombres y una batalla, 
 2015, Carlota Ferreira. 
 2016, Mejor Callar.
 2017, El sentir de las violetas.
 2018, Doña Cándida Saravia. 
 2019, El robo de la historia.
 2020,  Cuando todo pase. 
 2021, Qué poco vale la vida''.

References

1961 births
Living people
Uruguayan journalists
Uruguayan non-fiction writers